The 1990 NCAA Division I softball tournament was the ninth annual tournament to determine the national champion of NCAA women's collegiate softball. Held during May 1990, twenty Division I college softball teams contested the championship. The tournament featured eight regionals of either two or three teams, each in a double elimination format. The 1990 Women's College World Series was held in Oklahoma City, Oklahoma from May 23 through May 28 and marked the conclusion of the 1990 NCAA Division I softball season.  For the third consecutive year, UCLA won the championship by defeating  2–0 in the final game.

Qualifying

Regionals

Regional No. 1

UCLA qualifies for WCWS, 2–0

Regional No. 2

Fresno State qualifies for WCWS, 2–0

Regional No. 3

Arizona qualifies for WCWS, 2–1

Regional No. 4

Long Beach State qualifies for WCWS, 2–1

Regional No. 5

First elimination round
 2,  1
 2, San Jose State 1
UNLV 1, California 0

Second elimination round

UNLV qualifies for WCWS, 3–1

Regional No. 6

First elimination round
 1,  0 (20 innings)
 5, Connecticut 0
Oklahoma State 1, Adelphi 0

Second elimination round

Oklahoma State qualifies for WCWS, 3–0

Regional No. 7

First elimination round
 5,  0
 1, Texas A&M 0
Florida State 4, Southwestern Louisiana 3

Second elimination round

Florida State qualifies for WCWS, 3–0

Regional No. 8

First elimination round
 4,  0
Ohio State 2,  0
Kent State 3, Oregon 0

Second elimination round

Kent State qualifies for WCWS, 3–0

Women's College World Series

Participants

UCLA

Game results

Bracket

Championship Game

All-Tournament Team
The following players were named to the All-Tournament Team

See also
Women's College World Series
NCAA Division II Softball Championship
NCAA Division III Softball Championship
College World Series

References

1990 NCAA Division I softball season
NCAA Division I softball tournament